The 1971 Virginia Slims Grass Court Championships, also known as the Virginia Slims of Newport, was a women's tennis tournament played on outdoor grass courts at the Newport Casino in Newport, Rhode Island in the United States that was part of the 1971 Virginia Slims World Championship Series. It was the inaugural edition of the tournament and was held from August 24 through August 29, 1971. Fourth-seeded Kerry Melville won the singles title and earned $4,400 first-prize money. It is the only women's tournament to date where the singles title was decided by a sudden death nine point tiebreak.

Finals

Singles
 Kerry Melville defeated  Françoise Dürr 6–3, 6–7(3–5), 7–6(5–4)

Doubles
 Judy Dalton /  Françoise Dürr defeated  Kerry Harris /  Kerry Melville 6–2, 6–1

Prize money

References

Virginia Slims of Newport
Virginia Slims of Newport
1971 in sports in Rhode Island
August 1971 sports events in the United States